Najwa Ghanem (born c. 1960), is a Syrian woman who was the first wife and first cousin of Osama bin Laden, being the daughter of his mother's brother. She is also known as Um Abdallah (mother of Abdallah). She was born to Ibrahim and Nabeeha in Latakia, Syria, and her family was originally from Yemen. She had five siblings. Osama married Najwa in 1974 at the age of fourteen in Latakia. She travelled with Osama to Sudan and Afghanistan. According to Abu Jandal, she left Afghanistan before the September 11 attacks and did not return. According to Najwa and her son Omar bin Laden, she left Afghanistan on September 9, 2001. In 2005, Hutaifa Azzam, son of Abdullah Azzam, stated that she was living in Damascus with her son Abdel Rahman. She is the mother of 11 children, including Omar, Abdallah, Saad, Abdul Rahman, Osman, Mohammed, Fatima, Iman, Ladin, Rukhaiya and Nour. She co-authored Growing Up bin Laden with Omar. Her daughter Iman who was released by Iran in 2010 went to live with her in Syria. According to a close family member in 2011, Najwa's mother died of shock and grief after hearing of her son-in-law's death.

See also 
 Bin Laden family

References 

Bin Laden family
1960s births
Living people
Syrian women